The National Aquarium of New Zealand, formerly Napier Aquarium, is a public aquarium on Marine Parade in Napier, New Zealand. It was started in 1957 and moved to its present location in 1976. It is owned by Napier City Council. In addition to many fish species, exhibits include kiwi, tuatara, turtles, little penguins and some lizards.

History
In 1957, members of Napier's Thirty Thousand Club and the Hawke's Bay Aquarium and Water Garden Society decided to create a public aquarium with tropical fish and unusual specimens of local fish in the basement of the War Memorial Hall that was being built on Marine Parade.

The aquarium moved to its current location on Marine Parade in 1976. In its first year of its life it attracted 230,000 visitors at a time when the population of Napier was about 50,000. In its first 5 years of operation over 750,000 people visited.

The aquarium acquired piranhas from Cleveland, Ohio, U.S., in 1979, trading seahorses for them. In 2019 the 21 elderly piranhas remaining were euthanased, as new government rules no longer allowed them to be kept in the aquarium's tanks.

In 2002 the aquarium underwent a NZ$8 million extension and renovation which included the addition of a 1.5 million litre oceanarium with a 50m acrylic tunnel and the replacement of all the original tanks with newly constructed ones. It was renamed the National Aquarium of New Zealand.

Since 2017, aquarium staff have voted for the best behaved and naughtiest Penguin of the Month from the resident colony of little penguins, which has proved very popular on social media.

Facilities and exhibits
There are two temporary exhibit halls (one on the upper level and the other adjacent to the oceanarium), a souvenir shop and cafe.

Exhibits include:
East Coast LAB (Life at the Boundary) – Hikurangi plate boundary
African Cichlids
Amazon Pacu 
Asian Tropical 
Asian Paddyfield 
Dinosaur fossils
Asian Water Garden 
Australian Out Back 
Water Dragons

Waterfall
Coral Reef  
Tuatara 
New Zealand Stream 
Kiwi Enclosure 
New Zealand Fresh Water
Little Penguins
Eels 
Hawksbill Sea Turtle 
Rocky Shore 
Seahorse 
Oceanarium

See also
Marineland of New Zealand

References

External links

Aquaria in New Zealand
Tourist attractions in the Hawke's Bay Region
Buildings and structures in Napier, New Zealand
1970s architecture in New Zealand